Lelio Gama 105 St. is a skyscraper located in the Brazilian city of Rio de Janeiro. It was completed in 1980, and is 145 metres tall, with 40 floors. It is currently the second tallest building in Rio de Janeiro.

External links
Emporis

Bank buildings in Brazil
Office buildings completed in 1980
Skyscrapers in Rio de Janeiro (city)
Skyscraper office buildings in Brazil